Burton Dassett Halt was a railway station on the former Stratford-upon-Avon and Midland Junction Railway in Warwickshire, England.

History
It was opened in 1871, as Warwick Road by the East and West Junction Railway on its route from Stratford-upon-Avon to Fenny Compton near the village of Burton Dassett. However it was closed in 1873.

It was reopened as Burton Dassett Platform in 1909, by the newly formed Stratford-upon-Avon and Midland Junction Railway at the junction with the proposed Edge Hill Light Railway. However it closed again within three years, only to be opened once again in 1933, as Burton Dassett Halt. It then remained open until approximately 1946.

Routes

References

External links
 This station's entry on Warwickshire Railways

Disused railway stations in Warwickshire
Former Stratford-upon-Avon and Midland Junction Railway stations
Railway stations in Great Britain opened in 1871
Railway stations in Great Britain closed in 1973
Railway stations in Great Britain opened in 1909
Railway stations in Great Britain closed in 1912
Railway stations in Great Britain opened in 1933
Railway stations in Great Britain closed in 1946